John F. McBurney III (born December 8, 1950) was a Democratic member of the Rhode Island Senate, representing the 15th district from 1974 to 2010.

McBurney first won election to the Senate in 1974, replacing his father, John F. McBurney Jr., who had represented Pawtucket for 16 years.
He announced his retirement from the Senate on July 2, 2010. Democrat Donna Nesselbush was elected to succeed him.

References

External links
Rhode Island Senate - Senator John F. McBurney III official RI Senate website
Project Vote Smart - Senator John F. McBurney III (RI) profile
Follow the Money - John F. McBurney III
2006 2004 2002 2000 1998 1996 1994 campaign contributions

Democratic Party Rhode Island state senators
1950 births
Living people
Politicians from Pawtucket, Rhode Island
Rhode Island lawyers